The EQ245/EQ2100 is a 3.5 tonne capacity, six-wheel drive troop/cargo carrier truck developed and built by Dongfeng Motor Corporation and used by the People's Liberation Army of the People's Republic of China for transport.

It entered service in the 1980s as the EQ245 and renamed EQ2100E in the 1990s.

References
 Sino defence

EQ245 EQ2100
Military trucks of China
Military vehicles of the People's Republic of China